The Longevity Diet is a 2018 book by Italian biogerontologist Valter Longo. The subject of the book is fasting and longevity. The book advocates a fasting mimicking diet (FMD) coupled with a low protein, plant based diet.

Background
Valter Longo has a PhD in biochemistry, and he is the director of the Longevity Institute at the University of Southern California. The author studied the effects of diet on longevity and published his research findings in the book.

Synopsis
In 2018 he published the book which advises a low-protein, plant-based diet coupled with fasting. In the book Longo advises that the secret to avoiding the illnesses associated with old age is diet. Longo has said, "Using epidemiology and clinical trials, we put all the research together..." The diet calls for an emphasis on consuming fatty fish, and seafood, together with fasting, timing and food quantity.

The book advises that dieters start the diet with a five-day fasting mimicking diet (FMD), which calls for a vegan diet with calorie restriction from 800 and 1,100 calories per day. After the initial five-day period, the book advises that eating should occur within a 12 hour window each day.  The book calls for the five-day, calorie restriction FMD to occur twice per year. Before turning 65 the diet calls for minimal protein, and mostly plant-based diet augmented with calorie-restriction.

Reception
The book is an international bestseller and has been translated into more than 15 languages and it is sold in more than 20 countries. Writing for Red Pen Reviews Hilary Bethancourt states that the diet might be difficult and expensive to follow. In addition there is limited research on the long-term effects of the diet.

Reviewing the book for Glam Adelaide James Murphy's states, "Longo’s radical claims have not been accepted entirely yet by the medical establishment" and the book has "too much discussion of his thwarted ambitions to be a rock star".

References

Self-help books
Dieting books
Fasting
Books about life extension
Senescence